Final Analysis is a 1992 American neo-noir erotic thriller film directed by Phil Joanou and written by Wesley Strick from a concept by forensic psychiatrist Robert H. Berger. It stars Richard Gere, Kim Basinger, Uma Thurman, Eric Roberts, Keith David, and Paul Guilfoyle. The executive producers were Gere and Maggie Wilde. The film received mixed critical reviews, but was positively compared to the works of Alfred Hitchcock, particularly Vertigo. It is the final film of director of photography Jordan Cronenweth.

Plot
Psychiatrist Isaac Barr treats Diana Baylor for obsessive–compulsive disorder. Diana suggests Isaac meet her sister, Heather Evans, who may be able to shed light on her neuroses. Heather tells him that Diana was sexually abused by their father after their mother left. She reveals to him that she is unhappily married to gangster Jimmy Evans. Isaac confesses that he finds her irresistible, and the two have sex. Afterwards, Heather divulges that their father died in a fire, which Diana was suspected of starting.

At a restaurant with Jimmy, Heather has an episode of "pathological intoxication" after drinking wine and is taken to the hospital. After recovering, she sneaks away with Isaac to an abandoned lighthouse. While climbing the stairs, she drops her purse and lets loose a metal dumbbell handle, which she claims she keeps for protection.

Isaac's friend, defense attorney Mike O'Brien, informs him that Jimmy is under federal investigation for several financial crimes, and warns him to stay away from Heather. Isaac nevertheless follows her and Jimmy to a restaurant and confronts Jimmy. Claiming she feels ill, Heather leaves the restaurant, and gets a ride home from Isaac. Later that night, she drinks cough medicine, which brings on another episode. As Jimmy forces a kiss on her, she grabs one of his metal dumbbells and hits him over the head, killing him.

Heather is arrested for murdering Jimmy. Isaac hires Mike to represent her, and enlists expert on pathological intoxication to testify on her behalf. Heather is found not guilty by reason of insanity. She is sentenced to confinement at to a psychiatric facility, where she will be evaluated. Isaac assures Heather she will be released soon.

Isaac listens to a colleague's speech on one of Sigmund Freud's patients who had persistent dreams of arranging flowers, the same dream Diana had described to him during a session; Isaac realizes that Diana fabricated those stories. He talks to a courthouse guard who recognized Heather before her trial, and he recalls that she had been a spectator in the courthouse whenever Isaac testified as an expert witness. Mike tells Isaac that Jimmy's brother recently died, making Heather the beneficiary of Jimmy's $4 million life insurance policy. Isaac goes to the hospital to confront Heather, who admits to the ruse and threatens to incriminate him with the dumbbell she used to murder Jimmy, which has Isaac's fingerprints on it. Police detective Huggins, who suspects Isaac of killing Jimmy, warns him that he is being watched. Isaac tells Heather that he has reported her crime to two assistant district attorneys who want to interview her. She agrees, confident that double jeopardy will protect her.

During the evaluation, Heather fabricates a story about Isaac killing Jimmy. At Heather’s request, Diana joins her, but fails to bring the dumbbell; the investigators, meanwhile, are revealed to be psychiatrists. Heather loses her temper and threatens both Isaac and Diana, and has to be sedated. Isaac meets with Diana, who assures him that she dropped the dumbbell into the bay, but Isaac does not trust her. Isaac enlists Pepe Carrero, a former client, to follow Diana when she visits her sister.

Although Heather wants Diana to deliver the dumbbell to Huggins, Diana is too nervous to go through with it. Heather coerces her to switch clothes in the bathroom, allowing Heather to escape the hospital as "Diana". Pepe follows Heather, and tries to steal the dumbbell, but she shoots him in the chest. She telephones Huggins and arranges to meet him at a marina. Before going to the hospital, Pepe directs Isaac to the marina, where Isaac takes the dumbbell from Heather. She kidnaps him and Huggins and forces the latter to drive away from the marina.

A rainstorm hits, and Huggins crashes into the ocean. Isaac escapes the sinking car and Heather follows him to the lighthouse. As she chases Isaac onto the balcony, he deduces that Heather was the one who was raped by her father, not Diana, and she must have started the fire that killed him. Huggins appears to arrest Heather, who tries to shoot him. Isaac pulls her over the edge of the balcony, however, sending her falling to her death. Diana is tried as Heather’s accomplice, but is found not guilty. She then goes on a date with a wealthy man, posing as Heather.

Cast

 Richard Gere as Dr. Isaac Barr
 Kim Basinger as Heather Evans
 Uma Thurman as Diana Baylor
 Eric Roberts as Jimmy Evans
 Keith David as Detective Huggins
 Paul Guilfoyle as Mike O'Brien
 Robert Harper as Dr. Alan Lowenthal
 Agustin Rodriguez as Pepe Carrero
 Rita Zohar as Dr. Grusin
 George Murdock as Judge Costello
 Shirley Prestia as D.A. Kaufman
 Tony Genaro as Hector 
 Wood Moy as Dr. Lee
 Corey Fischer as Dr. Boyce
Rico Alaniz as Hugo
 John Roselius as Sheriff's Deputy
 Erick Avari as Moderator (uncredited) 
 Harris Yulin as Prosecuting Attorney (uncredited)

Production
Harold Becker, Joel Schumacher, and John Boorman were variously attached as director.

The original script was set in New York City, but was changed due to an ongoing union strike. San Francisco was chosen due to its "character" and iconic locations. The climax originally took place on the Golden Gate Bridge, but the sequence was re-written due to budget constraints. The climax instead took place at a lighthouse, filmed at Pigeon Point Lighthouse in Pescadero. Other filming locations included the San Francisco County Superior Court, the Letterman Army Hospital, and the Kimpton Sir Francis Drake Hotel.

Television comedy writer Susan Harris provided uncredited script rewrites.

Reception

Box office
The first week's gross was $6,411,441 and the total receipts for the film's run were $28,590,665.  In its widest release the film was featured in 1,504 theaters across the United States. The film grossed $47 million overseas for a worldwide gross of $75 million.

Critical response
Film critic Roger Ebert liked the screenplay and thought director Alfred Hitchcock, known for these types of thrillers, would have liked it as well.  He wrote, "I'm a sucker for movies that look and feel like this. I like the pounding romantic music, the tempestuous sex scenes, the crafty ways that neurotic meddlers destroy the lives of their victims, and of course the handcrafted climax..." Ebert also thought the movie was needlessly complex.

Vincent Canby, film critic for The New York Times,  was pleased with the work of the actors in the film and wrote, "Mr. Gere and Ms. Basinger are attractive as the furious lovers, but Mr. Roberts is the film's electrical force whenever he is on screen. Ms. Thurman does well as a sort of upscale slavey."

The staff at Variety magazine gave the film a positive film review, writing, "Final Analysis is a crackling good psychological melodrama [from a screen story by Robert Berger and Wesley Strick] in which star power and slick surfaces are used to potent advantage. Tantalizing double-crosses mount right up to the eerie final scene."

Many reviews were mixed. Kathleen Maher of the Austin Chronicle wrote, "Joanou, with his puppy dog devotion to noir thrillers and Hitchcock, is hoping to get it all right by painting by the numbers. He's mixed parts of Double Indemnity, The Big Sleep, and Vertigo, but the result doesn't even live up to Dead Again..." Maher was also critical of the two leads: "That Basinger and Gere are going to wind up in bed is no secret, but their courtship is excruciating, full of why-are-they-whispering scenes. At least Basinger gets better as she gets going, but Gere reverts to that shell-shocked acting style he adopts when lost at sea." Rita Kempley, writing in The Washington Post, called the film "an implausible psycho thriller" and said director Joanou "doesn't have any of his own ideas."

The film has an approval rating at Rotten Tomatoes of 56% based on 27 reviews.

Accolades

Nominations
 MTV Movie Awards
 Most Desirable Female, Kim Basinger (lost to Linda Hamilton for Terminator 2: Judgment Day)
 Golden Raspberry Awards
 Worst Actress - Kim Basinger (also for Cool World; lost to Melanie Griffith for Shining Through and A Stranger Among Us)
 Worst Picture - Charles Roven, Paul Junger Witt, and Tony Thomas (lost to Shining Through)
 Worst Screenplay - Wesley Strick (also story) and Robert Berger (story) (lost to Stop! or My Mom Will Shoot)

References

External links
 
 
 
 
 
 

1992 films
1992 romantic drama films
1992 thriller films
1990s erotic thriller films
1990s psychological thriller films
American erotic thriller films
Films about obsessive–compulsive disorder
Incest in film
American neo-noir films
American psychological thriller films
American romantic drama films
1990s English-language films
Films about psychiatry
Films about sisters
Films directed by Phil Joanou
Films produced by Charles Roven
Films scored by George Fenton
Works set in lighthouses
Films set in San Francisco
Films set in the San Francisco Bay Area
Films shot in San Francisco
Warner Bros. films
1990s American films